Cellophane is a thin transparent sheet made from regenerated cellulose.

Cellophane may also refer to:

Cellophane (band), a Californian rock band
"Cellophane" (FKA Twigs song), 2019
"Cellophane" (That Petrol Emotion song), 1988
"Cellophane", a song by Heroes & Zeros from Strange Constellations, 2006
"Cellophane", a song by Sia from 1000 Forms of Fear, 2014
Cellophane, an album by The Troggs, 1967
Cellophane, an album by Ashley Slater, 2008
"Cellophane", a song by King Gizzard & the Lizard Wizard from I'm in Your Mind Fuzz, 2014
Cellophane, a novel by Marie Arana, 2006

See also
Cellophane noodles, a type of transparent noodle